Wesley H. Sowers (August 26, 1905–February 2, 2008) was an American politician who served in the Kansas State Senate as a Republican  from 1971 to 1980. He originally joined the Kansas Senate in the 19th district for two years, before serving two full terms in the 31st district from 1973 to 1980.

References

1905 births
2008 deaths
American centenarians
Men centenarians
Republican Party Kansas state senators
20th-century American politicians
Politicians from Wichita, Kansas